Dark  Requiems... and  Unsilent Massacre is the second full-length album by the British symphonic black metal act Hecate Enthroned, released in 1998 by Blackend Records.

Stylistically this found the band utilising a slower, more ambient feel versus the speed and heaviness heard on their previous album, The Slaughter of Innocence. Keyboards and reverbed vocals were put more in the forefront, with less emphasis on guitar riffs and fast-paced percussion. This album was the last to feature keyboardist Michael Snell and vocalist Jon Kennedy, the latter of which was fired from the group, as well as the last to have a heavily symphonic black metal approach. The next album, Kings of Chaos, would feature a more death metal-oriented sound.

Track listing

Personnel 
Hecate Enthroned
 Jon Kennedy — vocals
 Nigel Dennen — guitar
 Andy Milnes — guitar
 Dylan Hughes — bass guitar
 Michael Snell — keyboards
 Rob Kendrick — drums

Miscellaneous staff
 Tim Turan — mastering
 Simon Marsden — photography, cover art
 Pete "Pee-Wee" Coleman — production

External links 
 Dark Requiems... at Encyclopaedia Metallum

1998 albums
Hecate Enthroned albums